The men's 200 metres at the 2022 World Athletics U20 Championships was held at the Estadio Olímpico Pascual Guerrero in Cali, Colombia on 3 and 4 August 2022.

Records
U20 standing records prior to the 2022 World Athletics U20 Championships were as follows:

Results

Round 1
The round 1 took place on 3 August, with the 55 athletes involved being splitted into 7 heats, 7 heats of 8 and 1 of 7 athletes. The first 3 athletes in each heat ( Q ) and the next 3 fastest ( q ) qualified to the semi-final. The overall results were as follows:

Wind:Heat 1: -1.4 m/s, Heat 2: +0.4 m/s, Heat 3: +1.0 m/s, Heat 4: -1.5 m/s, Heat 5: -0.3 m/s, Heat 6: -0.8 m/s, Heat 7: +0.1 m/s

Semi-final
The semi-final took place on 4 August, with the 24 athletes involved being splitted into 3 heats of 8 athletes each. The first 2 athletes in each heat ( Q ) and the next 2 fastest ( q ) qualified to the final. The overall results were as follows:

Wind:Heat 1: -0.2 m/s, Heat 2: -1.2 m/s, Heat 3: +0.1 m/s

Final
The final was started at 18:00 on 4 August. The results were as follows:

Wind: -1.0 m/s

References

200 metres men
200 metres at the World Athletics U20 Championships